Jack C. Hayya (March 10, 1929 – December 11, 2018) was professor emeritus of management science at the Pennsylvania State University.

Education
B.S., Civil Engineering, University of Illinois at Champaign-Urbana,  1952
M.S., Management, California State University, Northridge,  1961
Ph.D., Business Administration, University of California, Los Angeles,  1966

Personal 
In 1947, the government of Iraq sent him to study engineering in the United States.  During his undergraduate years he lived in the Cosmopolitan fraternity house at the University of Illinois at Urbana-Champaign, mostly with other foreign students.  He was an engineer on some large public works projects before returning to academia.

Publications (partial list)
He, Xin James, Kim, Jeon G., Hayya, Jack C.  The cost of lead-time variability: The case of the exponential distribution.
Ramasesh, Ranga V., Fu, Haizhen, Fong, Duncan K. H., Hayya, Jack C.  Lot streaming in multistage production systems.
Hong, Jae-Dong, Hayya, Jack C.  Just-In-Time purchasing: Single or multiple sourcing?.
Jack Hayya, Roger Pfaffenberger.  Student Workbook for Use with Statistical Methods for Business and Economics.  Paperback.  June 1987.  McGraw-Hill Education.  .  LC 0256036659.

References

External links
 Faculty homepage

Iraqi emigrants to the United States
California State University, Northridge alumni
Pennsylvania State University faculty
Grainger College of Engineering alumni
UCLA Anderson School of Management alumni
1929 births
2018 deaths
People from Baghdad